Ignatz Lichtenstein (1824 – October 16, 1908) was a Hungarian Orthodox rabbi who wrote "pamphlets advocating conversion to Christianity while still officiating as a Rabbi." Though he refused to be baptized into the Christian faith his whole life, he ultimately resigned his rabbinate in 1892. A biography of him appeared in the Methodist Episcopal missionary magazine The Gospel in All Lands in 1894. The Jewish historian Gotthard Deutsch, an editor of the Jewish Encyclopedia, in an essay published 3 February 1916, mentions him in the course of refuting a claim by the Chief Rabbi of London that no rabbi had ever become a convert to Christianity. Followers of Messianic Judaism mention him as an example of a turn of the 19th century "Jewish believer in Jesus." Speaking of his first contact with the gospel, he said: "I looked for thorns and gathered roses."

Bibliography 
Catalogues of works authored by the Rabbi, including this one, may make dubious attributions. Deutsch, for example, notes he is confused with a Rabbi Jehiel Lichtenstein (1831–1912) who worked for a missionary institute in Leipzig.

Original German Works:

 Der Talmud auf der Anklagebank durch einen begeisterten Verehrer des Judenthums [“The Talmud on the Dock by an Inspired Worshipper of Judaism”], Heft I (Budapest, 1886).
 Mein Zeugnis [“My Testimony”], Heft II (Budapest: Hornyánszky, 1886).
 Die Liebe und die Bekehrung [“Love and Conversion”], Heft III (Budapest, 1886).
 Judenthum und Christenthum [“Judaism and Christianity”], (Hamburg: A. Scheibenhuber, 1891?).
 Eine Bitte an die geehrten Leser [“An Appeal to Honored Readers”], (Budapest, 1893 or 1894), also known as Eine Bitte an das israelitische Volk
 “‘Zwei Briefe’ oder ‘was ich eigentlich will’” [“‘Two Letters’ or ‘What I Really Wish’”], Saat auf Hoffnung 30 (1893), 9-36.
 “Das Blut Christi, ein Nachklang aus dem Midrasch Echa” [“The Blood of Christ, an Echo of Midrash Ekhah”], Saat auf Hoffnung 30 (1893), 229-32.
 Judenspiegel [“The Jewish Mirror”] (Vienna: L. Schoenberger, 1896).
 “Welche Anknüpfungspunkte findet die evangelische Verkündigung bei den Juden?” [“Which Connecting Factors do Protestant Doctrines find with Jewish Doctrines?”] in Gustaf Dalman (ed.), Die allgemeine Konferenz für Judenmission in Leipzig, abgehalten vom 6. bis 8. Juni 1895, (Leipzig,1896), 40-55. [Series: Schriften des Institutum Judaicum in Leipzig, No. 44-46]; later reprinted by “The Hebrew Christian Testimony to Israel” in London as Begegnungspunkte zwischen Juden und Christen: Gesetz und Evangelium [“Points of Meeting between Jewish and Christian Doctrine: the Law and the Gospel”.] (London: H.C.T.I., 1902).
 “Ein Weihnachts- und Neujahrsgruß an alle Neugeborenen im Herrn” [“A Christmas and New Year Greeting to all the Born Again in the Lord”], Saat auf Hoffnung 36 (1899), 5-9.
 Ein Geheimniss aus dem Talmud [“A Secret from the Talmud”], (Vienna: L. Scnberger, 1900).
 “Ein Weihnachts- und Neujahrsgruß für die auserwählten Kinder des Lichtes” [“A Christmas and New Year Greeting for the Elect Children of the Light”], Saat auf Hoffnung 37 (1900), 35-40.
 “Ein Neujahrsgruß für die Neugebornen im Herrn zum Heilsjahre 1902” [“A New Year Greeting for the Born Again in the Lord in the Year, 1902”], Saat auf Hoffnung 39 (1902), 5-8.

Translations into English:

 J. Lichtenstein. Judaism and Christianity (translated from the German by Margaret M. Alison) (Edinburgh: Morrison & Gibb, 1893). [Translation of 4.]
 An Appeal to the Jewish People (Translated by Mrs. [?] Baron). [London]:  The Hebrew Christian Testimony to Israel (H. C. T. I., 1894). [Translation of 5.]
 "Letter from Rabbi Lichtenstein,” The Jewish Era 4:4 (Oct. 1895), 76.
 Two Letters’ or ‘What I Really Wish, (translated by Mrs. [?] Baron) (London:  The Hebrew Christian Testimony to Israel (H. C. T. I., 189?). [Translation of 6.]
 “What Connecting Links Does the Proclamation of the Gospel Find with the Jew?” [translated by Mrs. E. R. Kinglinger] The Jewish Era 5:1 (Jan. 1896), 1-3; 5:2 (April 1896), 37-42. [Translation of 9.]
 The Jewish Mirror (London: H. C. T. I., 1897). [Translation of 8.]
 The Points of Contact between Evangelical and Jewish Doctrine: An Address, Delivered at Leipsic [sic] (Translated from the German by Mrs. [David] Baron) (Northfield, England: H. C. T. I., 1897). [Translation of 9.]
 “A New Year’s Greeting to the Elect Children of Light,” The Jewish Era 7:2 (April 1898), 37-39.
 The Blood of Christ. H. C. T. I. (1903). [Translation of 7.]
 “A New Year’s Greeting from Rabbi Lichtenstein,” The Jewish Era 12:1 (Jan. 15, 1903), 1-3.

Original Hungarian Works:
 Két levél vagy Amit én tulajdonképpen akarok  [“Two Letters; or, What I Really Wish”]
 Kérelem a zsidó olvasókhoz  [“An Appeal to the Jewish People”]
 Zsidók tükre   [“The Jewish Mirror”]

Translations into French:
 Le Miroir Juif   [“The Jewish Mirror”]
 Points de Contact, Discours par le Rabbin Lichtenstein  [“Points of Meeting between Jewish and Christian Doctrine: the Law and the Gospel”]

Translation into Italian:

 Uno specchio giudaico, o le scritture riguardanti il messia  [“The Jewish Mirror”] (Traduzione della traduzione Inglese dell'originale Tedesco. Firenze : Tip. Fattori e Puggelli, 1914.)

Translation into Yiddish:

 מיין בקשה, פון הרב י' יצחק ליכטענשטיין  [“An Appeal to the Jewish People”]

References

External links 
 Online biography
 Introduction to The Collected Writings of Rabbi Isaac Lichtenstein
  English and German works (11) as PDF in the Remnant Repository of Vine of David
 The biography of Isaac Lichtenstien on Messianic Judaism Wiki
  English works and  German works and  Hungarian works of the rabbi

1824 births
1908 deaths
19th-century Hungarian writers
Religious writers
Hungarian missionaries
Hungarian Orthodox rabbis